The 1952–53 Ranji Trophy was the 19th season of the Ranji Trophy. Holkar won the title defeating Bengal in the final.

Highlights
 Kerala, as Travancore-Cochin, made its first appearance

Zonal Matches

South Zone 

(T) – Advanced to next round by spin of coin.

North Zone

West Zone

East Zone

Central Zone

Inter-Zonal Knockout matches

Final

Scorecards and averages
Cricketarchive
Cricinfo

References

External links

1953 in Indian cricket
Indian domestic cricket competitions